Ahoora is the debut album by the Iranian heavy metal band Ahoora, released illegally inside Iran on February 13, 2006.
The album was later re-released by Real2Can, appearing on iTunes in 2007  and on Amazon by 2008.

Reception 
Chronicles of Chaos wrote "Ahoora have clearly spent a lot of time honing their sound, both individually and as a unit, resulting in a coherent and tight album.”

Track listing

Personnel 
 Milad Tangshir – guitars, backing vocals
 Ashkan Hadavand – lead vocals
 Mamy Baei – bass
Produced by Ahoora

References 

2006 debut albums
Ahoora albums